John Frederick Fogerty  (1863–1938), was an Irish architect and engineer active late 19th-century Limerick, London, Shropshire, Bournemouth, Pretoria, and Zambia. Born in Limerick, he was the son of architect William Fogerty, grandson of architect and engineer John Fogerty (engineer), and nephew of engineer and novelist Joseph Fogerty.  He earned a bachelor's degree in engineering from Queen's College, Cork in 1883, and attended the South Kensington Art School the year later.  He was articled to Sir Thomas Drew. In 1889, he established his office at Wellington, Shropshire, and  entered into partnership with Reginald George Pinder in Bournemouth in 1893, later amalgamating Pearce & Parnell of Bournemouth in 1902.  He emigrated to South Africa in 1914 and enlisted at the outbreak of the First World War, serving time in South Africa, the Isle of Wight, Palestine, and Poona, India. During the interwar period, he worked as an engineer in Pretoria's Public Works Department, before becoming borough surveyor in Lusaka, Zambia, in 1926, where he died in 1938.

Works
His works include East Cliff Hall, Bournemouth (1897–1907) mansion for Merton and Annie Russell-Cotes.

References

1863 births
1938 deaths
19th-century Irish engineers
Engineers from County Limerick
Irish civil engineers
Architects from Limerick (city)
Irish emigrants to South Africa
Irish emigrants to Zambia
Alumni of Queens College Cork